Assata: An Autobiography is a 1988 autobiographical book by Assata Shakur. The book was written in Cuba where Shakur currently has political asylum.

Synopsis
The autobiography begins on May 2, 1973. Shakur recounts what happened after a shooting on the New Jersey State Turnpike. The shooting left Zayd Shakur and New Jersey State Trooper Werner Forrester killed, Assata Shakur wounded, and Sundiata Acoli on the run. The book continues with Shakur describing her early childhood growing up in Queens, New York with her mother, and spending her summers in Wilmington, North Carolina with her grandparents. Shakur tells her story by going back and forth between the "present" with Shakur's hospitalization, incarceration, pregnancy and trial following the events on the New Jersey State Turnpike; and the "past" with her early childhood schooling, the beginning of her radicalization, and her time as a prominent Black Power and human rights revolutionary.

"To My People"
"To My People" was a recorded statement released by Assata Shakur while in jail in Middlesex County, NJ. The tape was recorded on Independence Day, 1973, and was broadcast on numerous radio stations. Shakur includes the transcript of the recording in Chapter 3 of the autobiography. The recording was released in response to the media coverage about Shakur after the New Jersey Turnpike Shooting. In the recording, Assata publicly described herself as a black revolutionary, her participation in the Black Liberation Army and her participation in the incident. In the message Assata describes the corruption of police, structural inequality between blacks and whites, and the American support of brutal wars and regimes in Cambodia, Vietnam, and South Africa.

Major themes

Oppression and resistance
Shakur describes the oppression she faced and witnessed throughout her life. The book begins with the physical abuse she received from New Jersey police officers in the hospital after the shooting on the Turnpike. She discusses the trials against her and describes them as completely fabricated. Along with the oppression from the state, she recounts the racism her and her family experienced in North Carolina as well as watching the NAACP train people for peaceful protests and sit-ins. Shakur describes resistance methods taken by the NAACP including the peaceful, non-violence ideology. Though she does not adopt this, she respects it. Shakur chooses to take on roles with the Black Panther Party and Black Liberation Army as forms of resistance to social oppression.

Revolution
Throughout the book Shakur describes her personal desire to be a revolutionary, and the social revolution she believes is necessary for African Americans and other minorities. She discusses this revolution many times including in the “To My People” recording. The idea of revolution is also mentioned when she makes the opening statement at the New York State Supreme Court County of Kings during the trial against her; where she was accused of the kidnap of a drug dealer, for which she was acquitted.

Black Panther Party
In Chapter 13 Shakur describes her introduction into the Black Panther Party while visiting the Bay Area. Shakur discusses her reservations about joining the party with the members which included their lack of politeness and respect for the people they talked to. Shakur eventually joins while living in New York. It is when she joins the party, she witnesses and experiences the Federal Bureau of Investigation infiltration of political organizations now known as COINTELPRO. It is this surveillance that leads her to choose to go “underground” and eventually leave the party.

Critical reception
The New York Times review stated "The book's abrupt shifts in time can annoy after a while, as can the liberties she takes with spelling - court, America and Rockefeller, for example, become kourt, amerika and Rockafella. But, all in all, the author provides a spellbinding tale that evokes mixed feelings in the way the autobiographies of Malcolm X, Sonny Carson and Claude Brown did in years past."

Legacy and influence
The book was first published in the U.K. by Zed Books Ltd. in 1987. Zed Books describes its primary focus as publishing the works of oppressed people and groups. In 1999 an American edition was released by Lawrence Hill Books of Brooklyn, New York. 

Rapper Common released "A Song for Assata" in 2000 after visiting Shakur in Cuba. The song details some of the events in the book.

The 2014 edition of the book features forewords by activist Angela Davis and criminal justice scholar Lennox S. Hinds.

The book was adapted as an audio dramatization by BBC Radio 4 in July 2017.

References

African-American autobiographies
Political autobiographies
1988 non-fiction books
Autobiographies
African-American literature
Black Power
English-language books
Literature by African-American women
Non-fiction books about racism